Michael Paul Doyle (born 8 August 1981) is a former professional footballer and was most recently assistant head coach at League One club Forest Green Rovers. Born in Dublin, Doyle started his career at Celtic before a spell on loan in Denmark playing for AGF Aarhus. He subsequently spent the majority of his career at Coventry City and Sheffield United. Doyle has also been capped once by the Republic of Ireland.

Club career

Early career
Doyle began his career as a trainee at Celtic turning full professional for them in August 1998. He and fellow Celtic teammate Liam Miller had a spell on loan in the Danish Premier League at club AGF Aarhus, with Doyle playing 22 League games and scoring four goals for the Danish side. During his time at Celtic, Doyle failed to make a single league appearance for the first team.

Coventry City
After the loan spell ended, Doyle signed for Coventry City which was managed by Gary McAllister after a successful trial, having been recommended by McAllister's assistant Eric Black who worked with Doyle at Celtic. Doyle made his début against Peterborough United in the Football League Cup in August 2003, and scored in his appearance away against Ipswich Town in a 1–1 draw. Doyle played regularly throughout the season either side under the management of both McAllister and his successor Black.

Under Peter Reid, Doyle continued to play whenever fit, forging a useful partnership with captain Stephen Hughes. After Reid's departure Doyle continued to be favoured by new manager Micky Adams, scoring in the crucial away win at Watford, as the side avoided relegation from the Championship.

In 2005–06, Doyle continued to play regularly, captaining the side on a number of occasions since Christmas, notably in the 2–0 home win over Wolverhampton Wanderers. This came in his first match after a suspension for his dismissal in the previous home game against Crewe Alexandra for arguing with the referee. Doyle was named permanent captain of Coventry by Iain Dowie. Doyle was part of the Coventry team that beat Manchester United in the League Cup at Old Trafford, which remains one of the most famous League Cup upsets in recent years.

During the 2008–09 season, Doyle was a regular under Chris Coleman, starting 39 games for Coventry in all competitions. But due to the signing of Sammy Clingan from Norwich in the summer of 2009, Doyle found his first team place under threat, the reason for him wishing to seek guaranteed first team football elsewhere.

Leeds United (loan)
At the start of the 2009–10 season, Doyle joined Leeds United on a season long loan and made his first team début in the first game of the season,a win against Exeter. Having become first choice in midfield Doyle said in an interview to Yorkshire Evening Post on in October that he would love to make his loan move from Coventry permanent, and he hoped that if he could impress manager Simon Grayson enough and earn Leeds promotion that it would help his chances in securing a permanent contract at the Elland Road club. In his first six-months at Leeds, Doyle has been a regular starter partnering either Neil Kilkenny or Jonathan Howson in centre midfield, with Doyle only missing games through suspension or being rested by Simon Grayson for squad rotation.

After Leeds were knocked out of the Football League Trophy, Doyle was dropped from the starting line-up for the first time in the league against Leyton Orient but remained a regular first team player. Leeds were duly promoted to the Football League Championship after finishing in second place in League One and thus earning automatic promotion. In total Doyle had played 52 games for Leeds in all competitions during the course of the season. After promotion, Doyle claimed in interviews that he still wanted to join Leeds permanently rather than return to Coventry. He also revealed that promotion with Leeds was his greatest achievement of his football career to date.

Leeds manager Simon Grayson decided not to sign Doyle permanently, Doyle returned to Coventry. During Doyle's loan at Leeds, Coventry manager Chris Coleman had been sacked and succeeded by Adrian Boothroyd, who saw Doyle as an important member of the team. Doyle started the season as first choice midfielder alongside Lee Carsley in the heart of Coventry's midfield before dropping to the bench as the season progressed. Following this and in the build up to Coventry's game against his former club Leeds, Doyle controversially stated that his time at Leeds was the best year of his life. Back in the side Doyle scored his first goal for 21 months in November, a long range effort against Burnley.

Sheffield United
Doyle signed for Sheffield United on a free transfer during the January 2011 transfer window, a move that reunited him with former boss Micky Adams, and made his début in a 1–0 loss to Leicester City a few days later. He played regularly for the remainder of the season but with the club in decline he was unable to help to stop the Blades slipping to relegation. Regaining his place in the starting eleven at the outset of the following season, Doyle was awarded with the captain's armband as he played regularly in the centre of midfield. As the team challenged for promotion, Doyle scored his first goal for the Blades in January 2012, scoring against Yeovil Town at Bramall Lane.

United failed to gain promotion, but in September 2012, Doyle signed a new three-year contract with the club, committing his future until 2015. Doyle remained a regular in the side throughout the season as United fought another fruitless promotion battle.

Portsmouth
On 6 July 2015, Doyle joined Portsmouth after being released by Sheffield United. Doyle was made club captain, and was an integral part of a side which finished the season in sixth place, earning a place in the play-offs; Doyle and Portsmouth ultimately lost to Plymouth in the semi-finals. He finished the season with 50 appearances and 2 goals in all competitions.

He signed a one-year contract extension on 5 January 2016, keeping him at Portsmouth until the summer of 2017.

Doyle retained the captaincy during the 2016/17 season; a campaign which saw Portsmouth win the League Two championship after four years in the English professional game's basement division. Though Doyle's defensive midfield partner changed several times over the course of the season, with Danny Rose and Amine Linganzi vying for a place in the first XI, Doyle remained first-choice for the screening role in front of the defence. He featured 96 times for the Blues, finding the net on three occasions.

Return to Coventry City
On 11 May 2017, Doyle returned to Coventry City after having captained Portsmouth to its League Two victory. He commented that he would have resigned for Portsmouth if the club would have made an offer of a contract extension. Manager Mark Robins said that he was delighted in welcoming him back to his former club. He also added that his "leadership qualities on and off the pitch can not be underestimated". In the same season, Doyle captained Coventry City to League 1 promotion, when the team won the 2017-18 League Two Play-Off Final at Wembley against Exeter, marking back-to-back promotion successes for Doyle as a team captain. On 31 May 2018, Coventry City confirmed that Doyle's contract extension had been triggered, with the Sky Blues' captain's contract now expiring 30 June 2019. Doyle said "I came here to try and get this club back to the Championship where it should be and where it belongs..."[i]t's my club now and I will stay here and it will be my club for the rest of my life. "

Doyle triggered a one-year contract extension with Coventry at the end of the 2017–18 season.

Notts County
On 31 January 2019, Doyle signed for Notts County on a free transfer.

On 11 January 2020, Doyle scored his first goal for Notts, a strike from the halfway line which was later named as Notts' goal of the season.

He played in goal for 72 minutes in a 3-1 victory against Dagenham & Redbridge when regular goalkeeper Sam Slocombe was shown an early red card. He credited his years playing Gaelic football for Dublin GAA club St Mark's in Tallaght with providing him good practice for catching the ball.

On 4 May 2021, following the departure of Maurice Ross, Doyle agreed to take over as assistant head coach for the remainder of the 2020/21 season.

On 21 June 2021, Doyle agreed to become assistant head coach at Notts County permanently and whilst he is still registered as a player, his main focus will now be in his coaching role.

Coaching career

Forest Green Rovers 
On 27 May 2022, Doyle left his position as player/assistant head coach at Notts County, to join departing County manager Ian Burchnall as assistant head coach at League One club Forest Green Rovers.

On 27 January 2023, Doyle left Forest Green Rovers along with first-team coach Ben Turner after the club parted company with Ian Burchnall on 26 January 2023.

International career
Doyle made his debut for the Republic of Ireland when he appeared as a substitute for Andy Reid in a 1–0 win over Holland in Amsterdam in 2004 but it was to be his only cap. In 2007, he played for the Republic of Ireland B team.

Career statistics

Club

¹ One appearance and one goal in FA Trophy

Honours
Leeds United
Football League One runner-up: 2009–10

Portsmouth
EFL League Two: 2016–17

Coventry City
EFL League Two play-offs: 2018

Individual
Coventry City Player of the Year: 2004–05

References

External links

1981 births
Living people
Association footballers from Dublin (city)
Association football midfielders
Gaelic footballers who switched code
Republic of Ireland association footballers
Republic of Ireland B international footballers
Republic of Ireland international footballers
Republic of Ireland expatriate association footballers
Expatriate footballers in Scotland
Expatriate men's footballers in Denmark
Expatriate footballers in England
Celtic F.C. players
Aarhus Gymnastikforening players
Coventry City F.C. players
Leeds United F.C. players
Sheffield United F.C. players
Portsmouth F.C. players
Notts County F.C. players
English Football League players
Danish Superliga players
Outfield association footballers who played in goal
St Mark's Gaelic footballers
Notts County F.C. non-playing staff
Forest Green Rovers F.C. non-playing staff